Dinara Safina was the defending champion but lost in the quarterfinals to Amélie Mauresmo.

Mauresmo went on to win the title, defeating Mary Pierce in the final 6–1, 7–6(7–2).

Seeds
A champion seed is indicated in bold text while text in italics indicates the round in which that seed was eliminated. The top four seeds received a bye to the second round.

  Amélie Mauresmo (champion)
  Mary Pierce (final)
  Nadia Petrova (quarterfinals)
  Patty Schnyder (semifinals)
  Elena Dementieva (quarterfinals)
  Flavia Pennetta (first round)
  Dinara Safina (quarterfinals)
  Anna-Lena Grönefeld (first round)

Draw

Final

Section 1

Section 2

External links
 2006 Open Gaz de France draw

Singles
Open Gaz de France